Discos Musart is a Mexican record label founded in 1948. It is headquartered in Mexico City and remains one of the country's biggest labels, focusing on Mexican music, as well as international releases licensed from various labels around the world. Over the years it has had several imprints such as Trebol, Oasis and Balboa Records. During the 1950s, Musart distributed albums by Cuban label Panart in Mexico.

Until Capitol Records opened in Mexico in 1965, recordings by The Beatles were released by Musart Records in Mexico. Capitol re-releases now sometimes use completely different covers so detecting whether a Capitol version is actually an original Musart album or not can be difficult.

Musart was acquired by Concord Bicycle Music (now Concord) in 2016.

Artists 
The following artists have been part of the Musart roster:
Alberto Vázquez
Angélica María
Antonio Aguilar
Avelina Landín
Carmela Rey
Carmela y Rafael
César Costa
Chalino Sanchez
Cornelio Reyna
Dora María
El Piporro
Esmeralda
Flor Silvestre
Gloria Lasso
Hilda Aguirre
Irma Dorantes
Joan Sebastian
Juan Torres Robles (organist)
La Panchita
Lisa Lopez
Lorenzo Antonio
Los Felinos
Lucerito
Lucha Villa
Lupe Silva
Manolo Muñoz
María Alma
María Dolores Pradera
María Enriqueta
Mercedes Castro
Olga Guillot
Pancho Barraza
Paquita la del Barrio
Pepe Aguilar
Rosa de Castilla
Rosita Quintana
Sylvester James
Uberto Zanolli

See also
List of record labels

References

External links
Official Musart Website

Mexican record labels
Latin American music record labels